The 1889–90 British Home Championship was an edition of the annual international football tournament played between the British Home Nations. The seventh such competition held, the 1890 edition was, for the second time, jointly won by England and Scotland, the sixth time that Scotland had won. Played during the second half of the 1889/90 season, the tournament was also notable for two matches played by England on the 15 March against Wales and Ireland simultaneously. With an increasingly crowded domestic schedule cramping available dates for matches, England fielded two entirely separate teams, both of which won their games with an aggregate of twelve goals to two.

Wales took the early lead in the competition, winning the opening game at home against Ireland. England's double victories over Wales and Ireland then placed them in front with favourites Scotland still to play a match. Scotland responded to England's lead with two comfortable wins over Wales and Ireland 5–0 and 4–1 leaving the final match between England and Scotland as the deciding game. Despite a furious and dramatic encounter, neither side could best the other and the result was a 1–1 draw, placing both England and Scotland at the head of the table, goal difference not at this stage being used to differentiate the teams.

Table

Results

Winning squads

References

British Home Championship
British Home Championships
Brit
Brit
Brit
Brit